José "Zé" Aldo Soares de Oliveira Filho (born 25 July 1998), known as José Aldo, is a Brazilian professional footballer who plays as a midfielder for Ituano.

Professional career
Born in Surubim, Pernambuco, José Aldo joined Palmeiras' youth setup in 2015, after being the top goalscorer of the U17 Campeonato Catarinense for Guarani de Palhoça. In April 2018, he agreed to a one-year loan deal with Internacional, and was initially assigned to the youth setup.

Promoted to the first team in May 2019, José Aldo's loan was extended until the end of the season, and he made his first team – and Série A – debut on 15 September, in a 3–1 win over Atlético Mineiro. The following 1 January, his loan was extended until June 2020, with a buyout clause.

On 7 July 2020, José Aldo moved abroad and agreed to a one-year loan deal with Portuguese Primeira Liga side Portimonense.

Honours 
Sport Club Internacional
Brazilian Under-23 Football Championship
Paysandu Sport Club
Copa Verde: 2022

References

External links
 Internacional profile 
 

1998 births
Living people
Sportspeople from Pernambuco
Brazilian footballers
Association football midfielders
Guarani de Palhoça players
Sport Club Internacional players
Portimonense S.C. players
Esporte Clube Pelotas players
Paysandu Sport Club players
Ituano FC players
Campeonato Brasileiro Série A players
Campeonato Brasileiro Série C players
Brazilian expatriate footballers
Brazilian expatriate sportspeople in Portugal
Expatriate footballers in Portugal